Hed or HED may refer to:

 Harley Ellis Devereaux, American architecture and engineering firm
 HED Cycling Products, an American bicycle wheel manufacturer
 HED meteorite, "Howardite–Eucrite–Diogenite"
 Hed PE, a rapcore band
 Hed socken, a locality in Sweden
 Hypohidrotic ectodermal dysplasia
 Fredrik Andersson Hed, (born 1972) Swedish professional golfer
 Headline of a news story (jargon)
 'A-Hed', a featured-story designation in the Wall Street Journal
 Fictional country, setting of the fantasy novel The Riddle-Master of Hed